Michael Hammer or Mike Hammer may refer to:
Michael Armand Hammer (1955–2022), American philanthropist and businessman
Michael Martin Hammer (1948–2008), engineer and author
Mike Hammer (character), a fictional hard boiled detective
Mickey Spillane's Mike Hammer (1958 TV series)
Mickey Spillane's Mike Hammer (1984 TV series)
Mike Hammer (diplomat) (born 1963), official in the U.S. State Department

See also
Michael Hammers (born 1965), German artist and designer
Hammer (surname)